Slavutych or Slavutich (Cyrillic: Славутич) means son of Slavuta. Slavuta is an archaic name for the Dnieper river. Nowadays it may refer to the following:

 Slavutych, a town in the Kyiv Oblast of Ukraine
 Slavutych (Kyiv Metro), a station of the Kyiv Metro
 Ukrainian command ship Slavutych, formerly of the Ukrainian Navy
 Slavutych (beer), a brand of Ukrainian beer
 Slavutych Brewery, Kyiv, Ukraine
 Slavutych-Arena, a football (soccer) stadium in Zaporizhzhya
 FC Slavutych, Slavutych, Kyiv, Ukraine; a soccer team

See also